Ishara TV is an Indian Hindi language free-to-air general entertainment television channel owned by IN10 Media. The network's programming consists of family dramas, mythological shows, family dramas, romantic serials, thriller and crime serials. The channel is also available on DD Free Dish from 1 April 2022 on LCN 9.

Current Programming

Acquired shows

Animated Shows
 ViR: The Robot Boy
 Akul Nakul
 Fred Kismat Wala

Former broadcasts

Original series 
Humkadam
Agni Vayu
Paapnaashini Ganga
Janani
Bhabhi Ke Pyare Pritam Hamare
Farar Kab Tak

Acquired shows
Siyaasat
Rabindranath Tagore Ki Kahaaniyan
Tyohaar Ki Thaali
Raja Rasoi Aur Andaaz Anokha
Gujrat Bhawan
Yam Kisi Se Kam Nahi

Animated Shows
 Raat Hone Ko Hai
 Krishna Balram
 Akki Jaanbaaz
 Marcus Khiladi

References

External links 
 

Television stations in Mumbai
Hindi-language television stations
Television channels and stations established in 2021
Hindi-language television channels in India
IN10 Media Network